Jacques Stas (born 6 February 1969) is a Belgian professional basketball coach and former national team player. He is an assistant coach for Belgium's national basketball team.

His last team as an active player was Spirou Charleroi in Belgium.

References

External links
Basket Belgium Profile
Eurobasket.com Profile
Basketball-Reference.com Profile

1969 births
Living people
Belgian men's basketball players
Spirou Charleroi players
Sportspeople from Liège